Karauli District is a district of Rajasthan  in western India. It is located in the Braj region. The town of Karauli is the district headquarters. Karauli District comes under Bharatpur Divisional Commissionerate. Karauli is famous for popular red-stone.

The population of the district is 1,458,248 (2011 census), indicating a population density is 264 persons per km2.

Geography and location
It is bordered by Dholpur District to the east; by Bharatpur District to the north-east; by Dausa District to the north; and by Sawai Madhopur District to the west.

The Chambal River forms the south-eastern boundary of the district,  from Mandrayal across which lies the state of Madhya Pradesh.

Good grade stone and some iron ore comprise the mineral resources of the area.

Topography
Karauli's natural environment includes the Vindhyanchal and Aravali mountains. The district has plain, high and low and hilly parts. The plains are fertile and clay is lightweight and sandy. There are many rivers in the district.

History

Availability of minerals
Sandstone, masonry stone, silica sand, soapstone, white clay are the major minerals found in this district. About 200 small units are using sandstone for cutting and polishing of stones to be used in building making.

Location
Karauli city is in the Karauli district in the east of Rajasthan state in western India.

Tourist places
It is located on the banks of the Kalisil river, a tributary of the Banas River in the hills of Trikut,  to the north-west of Kaila village. The temple is dedicated to the tutelary deity, goddess Kaila Devi, of the erstwhile princely Jadaun Rajput rulers of the Karauli state. It is a marble structure with a large courtyard of a checkered floor. In one place are a number of red flags planted by devotees.
Madan Mohan Temple is a form of the Hindu god Krishna. Krishna is celebrated as Madan Mohan, who mesmerises everyone. His consort, Radha is glorified as Madan Mohan's Mohini, the mesmeriser of the mesmeriser for spiritual aspirants. Radha is known as the mediator without whom access to Krishna is not possible.
Mehandipur Balaji Temple is a mandir in the Indian state of Rajasthan dedicated to the Hindu God Hanuman. The name Balaji is applied to Sri Hanuman in several parts of India because the childhood (Bala in Hindi or Sanskrit) form of the Lord is especially celebrated there. It is important to note that the temple is not dedicated to Balaji another name for Krishna. Unlike similar religious sites it is located in a town rather than the countryside. Its reputation for ritualistic healing and exorcism of evil spirits attracts many pilgrims from Rajasthan and elsewhere.
Shri Mahavir Ji Temple is in Hindaun City. Earlier known as Chandanpur, this small village became famous as a Jain religious site after an ancient idol of Mahaveer was excavated from its soil several hundred years ago. It was then renamed as Shri Mahaveer Ji This idol was excavated over 200 years ago from the same spot, after which the temple was constructed. Thousands of worshipers flock from across India to catch a glimpse of this statue.
Nakkash Ki Devi - Gomti Dham Temple is in Hindaun City. It is a Hindu Devi Temple of Durga Mata and Gomti Dham is a Temple and Vatika(ashram) of Gomti Dass Ji Maharaj.
Mandrayal,  from the district headquarters is Mndrayl Durg. The year 1327 was dominated by Arjun Dev about the ruler of Karauli. The Trinity Baradari temple, located in the middle of the court, and is worth a visit Bala Durg. Rhugat in Chambal River flows nearby waterfall.

Mundri =there is a tejaji temple and balaji tample

Bhairav baba mandir bhairv/bhairo baba mandir 8.5 km from the block todabhim. Village - gazipur, kariri

Forest
As per the records of 2011–2012, total  rainfall was recorded against  average rainfall.

Administrative setup
Karauli City is the district headquarters of Karauli district, which is divided into eight tehsils, six subdivisions, 223 panchayats, 881 villages, six panchayat samiti and two Nagar Parishad, and one Nagarpalika.

Subdivisions in Karauli District
 Hindaun Subdivision
 Karauli
 Todabhim
 Nadoti
 Sapotra
 Mandrayal
 Suroth
 Masalpur
 Shri Mahaveer ji

Panchayat Samiti in Karauli
 Hindaun Panchayat Samiti
 Karauli
 Todabhim
 Nadoti
 Sapotra
 mandrayal
 Masalpur
 Shri Mahaveer Ji

Nagar- Parishad & Palika
 Hindaun City
 Karauli
 Todabhim
 Sapotra

Weather
The climatic condition of Karauli district is throughout the year sunny temperature ranging between high  and low . The humidity of this region ranges from 31 to 35% with a dew point of 11° to 15°. The winds speed is NW . The chance of precipitation may be 30% to 40%. During the rainy season the village gets scattered showers. This region is termed to be dry climate area of subtropical region. There is also distinct winter and long summer season. The recorded highest temperature is  during May–June and lowest temperature is  during January. The monsoon season falls in July to September.

Settlements 
Hindaun
Karoli ke samacharRoli ki vid
Todabhim
Nadauti
Sapotara

Temples
There are four major temples in Karauli district, hence they are called Char Dham of Karauli:
Kaila Devi temple, Kaila devi, Karauli
 Krishna temple, Karauli (Madan Mohan)
 Mehandipur Balaji Temple, Todabhim Karauli
Anjani Mata TempleKarauli,

ग्रामीण क्षेत्र के प्रमुख मंदिर करौली
Nande Bhumia Temple, Tulsipura, Karauli
Sona Bhumia temple,Sahajpur,karauli,
 bhadiye baba temple ,pareeta Karauli,

Hindaun Block prominent temple Karauli
 Shri Mahavirji Temple, Hindaun City
 Narsinghji Temple, Hindaun City
 Nakkash Ki Devi - Gomti Dham, Hindaun City
 Kyarda Hanumanji Temple, Hindaun City Karauli
 Shri Hardev Ji Maharaj Temple

 Shri Raghunath Ji Temple

Shri Radha Raman Ji Temple

Todabhim block prominent temple Karauli
Mehandipur Balaji todabhim Karauli

Bhairav baba temple, gazipur Todabhim Karauli

Economy
In 2006 the Ministry of Panchayati Raj named Karauli one of the country's 250 most backward districts (out of a total of 640). It is one of the twelve districts in Rajasthan currently receiving funds from the Backward Regions Grant Fund Programme (BRGF).

Demographics

According to the 2011 census Karauli district has a population of 1,458,248, roughly equal to the nation of Eswatini or the US state of Hawaii. This gives it a ranking of 340th in India (out of a total of 640).
Its population growth rate over the decade 2001-2011 was 20.57%. Karauli has a sex ratio of 858 females for every 1000 males, and a literacy rate of 67.34%. 14.96% of the population lives in urban areas. Scheduled Castes and Scheduled Tribes make up 24.31% and 22.28% of the population respectively. Hindi is the predominant language, spoken by 99.31% of the population.  

Meena and Gurjar caste dominates in Karauli.

References

External links

Karauli founded by Maharaja Arjun Dev Pal
 

 
Districts of Rajasthan
Districts in Bharatpur division